George Washington High School is a public secondary school located at 298 Washington Drive in Mangilao, in the United States territory of Guam.

The school, a part of the Guam Department of Education (formerly Guam Public School System), opened in 1965 and serves grades 9 through 12.

As of 2014 the school serves the villages of Mangilao, Agana Heights, Chalan Pago-Ordot, and Sinajana. At the start of this school year, students residing in the villages of Barrigada and Mongmong-Toto-Maite are required to attend Tiyan High School. 

The U.S. Census Bureau puts the school into the University of Guam census-designated place.

Student body
During the 2009-2010 school year, the school had 2,610 students. Of them, 1,750 (67%) were Chamorro, 346 (13.3%) were Filipino, 199 (7.6%) were Chuukese, 60 (2.3%) were Palauan, 43 (1.6%) were Yapese, 37 (1.4%) were Others/Mixed, 34 (1.3%) were White non-Hispanic, 32 (1.2%) were Pohnpeian, 17 were from Saipan, 14 were Korean, 13 were other Pacific Islanders (such as Fijians), 12 were African American, 11 were Marshallese, 8 were Chinese, 6 were Hawaiian, 6 were Hispanic, 6 were Kosraean, 5 were from Rota, 3 were Japanese, 3 were Samoan, 2 were Native American/Alaska Natives, 2 were Vietnamese, and 1 was Indonesian.

George Washington High School requires uniforms, along with the rest of the schools under the Guam Public School System.

Notable alumni
 Rosanne Santos Ada - Guamanian First Lady of Guam.
 Esther Aguigui, Guam adjutant general
 Lourdes Perez Camacho - Guamanian Medical Technologist and First Lady of Guam.
 Carmen Fernandez - Guamanian businesswoman, politician, and college administrator. 
 Franklin Quitugua, Guam politician
 Roman Tmetuchl, Paluan politician
 Frances Tydingco-Gatewood, Judge of the District Court of Guam

References

External links

 George Washington High School

Public high schools in Guam
Educational institutions established in 1965
1965 establishments in Guam